Simpsons Gap (Arrernte: Rungutjirpa) is one of the gaps in the West MacDonnell Ranges in Australia's Northern Territory. It is located 18 kilometres west from Alice Springs, on the Larapinta Trail.

The gap is home to various plants and wildlife, including the black-footed rock-wallaby. It is the site of a permanent waterhole.

History 
Rungutjirpa is an important spiritual place for the Arrernte people, who have inhabited the Arrernte area since before European discovery. It was later visited by surveyor Gilbert Rotherdale McMinn in 1871 while he was searching for a better route for the Overland Telegraph Line.

Tourism
Section 1 of the Larapinta Trail begins at Alice Springs Telegraph Station and ends at the waterhole at Rungutjirpa.

Gallery

References

Canyons and gorges in the Northern Territory
Tourist attractions in Alice Springs